Parchineh (also Romanized as Parchīneh; also known as Birdzhinakh, Birjīnah, Bīrjīneh, and Parjīneh) is a village in Gilvan Rural District, in the Central District of Tarom County, Zanjan Province, Iran. At the 2006 census, its population was 68, in 19 families.

References 

Populated places in Tarom County